Gonepteryx maxima is a butterfly of the family Pieridae. It was described by Arthur Gardiner Butler in 1885. It is found from north-eastern China to Korea, Japan, the Russian Far East (Amur, Ussuri) and Japan. The habitat consists of steppe and forest-steppe areas.

Adults are on wing from the end of July to September. Adults overwinter and fly again from May to June.

The larvae feed on Rhamnus ussuriensis.

Subspecies
Gonepteryx maxima maxima
Gonepteryx maxima amurensis Graeser, 1888 (Amur, Ussuri)

References

 Gonepteryx maxima Butler, 1885 at Insecta.pro

Butterflies described in 1885
Gonepteryx
Butterflies of Asia
Taxa named by Arthur Gardiner Butler